Samuel Jones (November 12, 1924 – December 15, 1981) was an American jazz double bassist, cellist, and composer.

Background
Sam Jones was born in Jacksonville, Florida, United States, to a musical family.  His father played piano and drums and his aunt played organ in church. In 1955, he moved to New York City and began his recording career with Tiny Bradshaw, before working with Bill Evans, Bobby Timmons, Les Jazz Modes, Kenny Dorham, Illinois Jacquet, Freddie Hubbard, Dizzy Gillespie (1958–59), and Thelonious Monk. He is probably best known for his work with Cannonball Adderley, performing in his quintet from 1955 to 1956 and then again from 1959 to 1964, and recording extensively for Riverside Records as both a leader and sideman. He later spent several years working with Oscar Peterson (1966-1970) and Cedar Walton (1972-1977). In the 1970s, Jones recorded several albums as a bandleader for the Xanadu and SteepleChase labels. Jones wrote the jazz standards "Del Sasser" and "Unit 7" while working with Adderley. Other compositions include "Blue Funk", "O.P.", "Bittersweet", and "Seven Minds".

He died of lung cancer in 1981 at the age of 57.

Discography

As leader 
 1960: The Soul Society (Riverside)
 1961: The Chant (Riverside)
 1962: Down Home (Riverside)
 1974: Seven Minds (East Wind)
 1976: Cello Again (Xanadu)
 1976: Double Bass (SteepleChase) – with Niels-Henning Ørsted Pedersen 
 1977: Changes & Things (Xanadu)
 1977: Something in Common (Muse)
 1978: Visitation (SteepleChase)
 1979: Groovin' High  (Muse)
 1979: The Bassist! (Interplay) – with Keith Copeland, Kenny Barron
 1979: Something New (Interplay)
 1988: Right Down Front: The Riverside Collection (Original Jazz Classics) – compilation of Riverside recordings

As sideman

With Cannonball Adderley
 Sophisticated Swing (1957; EmArcy)
 Cannonball Enroute (1957; EmArcy)
 Cannonball's Sharpshooters (1958; EmArcy)
 Somethin' Else (1958; Blue Note)
 Portrait of Cannonball by Cannonball Adderley (1959; Riverside)
 The Cannonball Adderley Quintet in San Francisco (1959; Riverside)
 Them Dirty Blues by Cannonball Adderley (1960; Riverside)
 The Cannonball Adderley Quintet at the Lighthouse (1960; Riverside)
 African Waltz (1961; Riverside)
 The Cannonball Adderley Quintet Plus (1961; Riverside)
 Nancy Wilson and Cannonball Adderley (1961; Riverside)
 The Cannonball Adderley Sextet in New York (1962; Riverside)
 Cannonball in Europe! (1962; Riverside)
 Jazz Workshop Revisited (1962; Riverside)
 Autumn Leaves (1963; Riverside [Japan])
 Nippon Soul (1963; Riverside)
 The Sextet (Milestone, 1962-63 [1982])
 Cannonball Adderley Live! (1964)
 Live Session! (1964)
 Cannonball Adderley's Fiddler on the Roof (1964)
 Domination (1965–70; Capitol)
 Phenix (1975, Fantasy)

With Nat Adderley
To the Ivy League from Nat (1956; EmArcy)
Much Brass (1961; Riverside)
Work Song (1960; Riverside)
That's Right! (1960; Riverside)
Naturally! (1961; Jazzland)
In the Bag (1962; Jazzland)
Autobiography (1964; Atlantic)
With Joe Alexander
Blue Jubilee (Jazzland, 1960)

With Gene Ammons
Jug & Dodo (Prestige, 1962 [1972]) – with Dodo Marmarosa
God Bless Jug and Sonny (Prestige, 1973 [2001]) – with Sonny Stitt
Left Bank Encores (Prestige, 1973 [2001]) – with Sonny Stitt
Together Again for the Last Time (Prestige, 1973 [1976]) – with Sonny Stitt
Goodbye (Prestige, 1974)

With Chet Baker
It Could Happen to You (Riverside, 1958)

With Walter Bishop Jr. 
Valley Land (Muse, 1974 [1976])
Hot House (Muse, 1977/78 [1979])

With Tina Brooks
True Blue (1960; Blue Note)

With Ray Brown
Ray Brown with the All-Star Big Band (Verve, 1962)

With Ray Bryant
All Blues (Pablo, 1978)

With Kenny Burrell
Blue Lights Volume 1 (1958; Blue Note)
Blue Lights Volume 2 (1958; Blue Note)
Swingin' (Blue Note, 1956 [rel. 1980])
With Donald Byrd
Off to the Races (1958; Blue Note)
Byrd in Hand (1959; Blue Note)
With James Clay
The Sound of the Wide Open Spaces!!!! (Riverside, 1960) – with David "Fathead" Newman
A Double Dose of Soul (Riverside, 1960)
With Arnett Cobb
More Party Time (Prestige, 1960)
Movin' Right Along (Prestige, 1960)
With Al Cohn
Al Cohn's America (Xanadu, 1976)
True Blue (Xanadu, 1976) – with Dexter Gordon
Silver Blue (Xanadu, 1976) – with Dexter Gordon
With George Coleman
Amsterdam After Dark (Timeless, 1979)
With Ronnie Cuber
Cuber Libre (Xanadu, 1976)
With King Curtis
Soul Meeting (Prestige, 1960)
With Walter Davis Jr.
Davis Cup (1959; Blue Note)
With Lou Donaldson
 The Time Is Right (1959; Blue Note)
 Sunny Side Up (1960; Blue Note)
 Blowing in the Wind (1966; Cadet)
With Kenny Dorham
'Round About Midnight at the Cafe Bohemia (1956; Blue Note)
And The Jazz Prophets, Vol. 1 (1956; ABC-Paramount)
This Is the Moment! (1958; Riverside)
With Kenny Drew
Undercurrent (1960; Blue Note)
With Ted Dunbar
Opening Remarks (Xanadu, 1978)
With Bill Evans
Everybody Digs Bill Evans (1958; Riverside)
With Art Farmer
Homecoming (Mainstream, 1971)
Yesterday's Thoughts (East Wind, 1975)
To Duke with Love (East Wind, 1975)
The Summer Knows (East Wind, 1976)
Art Farmer Quintet at Boomers (East Wind, 1976)
With Victor Feldman
Merry Olde Soul (Riverside, 1961)
With Red Garland
Red in Blues-ville (Prestige, 1959)
The Red Garland Trio + Eddie "Lockjaw" Davis (Moodsville, 1959) – with Eddie "Lockjaw" Davis
Halleloo-Y'-All (Prestige, 1960)
Soul Burnin' (Prestige, 1959–61)
Bright and Breezy (Jazzland, 1961)
Solar (Jazzland, 1962)
Red's Good Groove (Jazzland, 1962)
Auf Wiedersehen (MPS, 1971 [1975])
Feelin' Red (Muse, 1978)
With Terry Gibbs
Take It from Me (Impulse!, 1964)
Bopstacle Course (Xanadu, 1974)
With Dizzy Gillespie
The Ebullient Mr. Gillespie (Verve, 1959)
Have Trumpet, Will Excite! (Verve, 1959)
With Paul Gonsalves
Gettin' Together (1960; Jazzland)
With Dexter Gordon
The Jumpin' Blues (Prestige, 1970)
Biting the Apple (SteepleChase, 1977)
With Rein de Graaff
New York Jazz (Timeless Records,1979) – with Louis Hayes
With Grant Green
Gooden's Corner (Blue Note, 1961 [1980])
Nigeria (Blue Note, 1962 [1980]
Oleo (Blue Note, 1962 [1980])
Born to Be Blue (Blue Note, 1962 [1985])
With Johnny Griffin
The Little Giant (Riverside, 1959)
Bush Dance (Galaxy, 1978)
With Barry Harris
Barry Harris at the Jazz Workshop (Riverside, 1960)
Live in Tokyo (Xanadu, 1976)
With Louis Hayes
Louis Hayes (Vee-Jay, 1960)
With Jimmy Heath
The Time and the Place (Landmark, 1974 [1994])
Picture of Heath (Xanadu, 1975)
With Johnny Hodges
Back to Back: Duke Ellington and Johnny Hodges Play the Blues (Verve, 1959)
Blue Hodge (Verve, 1961)
With John Lee Hooker
That's My Story (Riverside, 1960)
With Freddie Hubbard
Open Sesame (Blue Note, 1960)
With Fred Jackson
Hootin' 'n Tootin' (Blue Note, 1962)
With Milt Jackson
Bags Meets Wes! (Riverside, 1961)With Willis JacksonMore Gravy (Prestige, 1963)With Eddie JeffersonThings Are Getting Better (Muse, 1974)With J. J. JohnsonA Touch of Satin (Columbia, 1962)With Etta JonesIf You Could See Me Now (Muse, 1978)With Hank JonesGroovin' High (Muse, 1978)With Jo JonesThe Main Man (Pablo, 1977)With Philly Joe JonesDrums Around the World (Riverside, 1959)With Clifford JordanGlass Bead Games (Strata-East, 1974)
Half Note (SteepleChase, 1974 [1985])
Night of the Mark VII (Muse, 1975)
On Stage Vol. 1 (SteepleChase, 1975 [1977])
On Stage Vol. 2 (SteepleChase, 1975 [1978])
On Stage Vol. 3 (SteepleChase, 1975 [1979])
Firm Roots (Steeplechase, 1975)
The Highest Mountain (Steeplechase, 1975)With Duke JordanMisty Thursday (SteepleChase, 1975 [1976])
Duke's Delight (SteepleChase, 1975 [1976])
Lover Man (SteepleChase, 1975 [1979])With Wynton KellyWynton Kelly! (Vee Jay, 1961)With Harold LandWest Coast Blues! (Jazzland, 1960)With Yusef LateefThe Gentle Giant (Atlantic, 1971)
Part of the Search (Atlantic, 1973)With Abbey LincolnIt's Magic (Riverside, 1958)
Abbey Is Blue (Riverside, 1959)With Mike LongoMatrix (Mainstream, 1972)With Johnny LytleNice and Easy (Jazzland, 1962)With Chuck MangioneRecuerdo (Jazzland, 1962)With Warne Marsh How Deep, How High (Interplay, 1976 [1980])With Jack McDuffThe Heatin' System (Cadet, 1971)With Ken McIntyreLooking Ahead (New Jazz, 1960) – with Eric DolphyWith Charles McPhersonSiku Ya Bibi (Day of the Lady) (Mainstream, 1972)
Beautiful! (Xanadu, 1975)
Live in Tokyo (Xanadu, 1976)With Billy MitchellThe Colossus of Detroit (Xanadu, 1978)With Blue MitchellOut of the Blue (1959; Riverside)
Blue Soul (1959; Riverside)
Blue's Moods (1960; Riverside)
A Sure Thing (1962; Riverside)With Thelonious MonkAt Town Hall (1959; Riverside)
5 by Monk by 5 (1959; Riverside)
Les Liaisons Dangereuses 1960 (1959 [2017]); Sam Records)With Wes MontgomeryMovin' Along (1960)With Tete MontoliuSecret Love (Timeless, 1977)With Phineas Newborn Jr.A World of Piano! (Contemporary, 1962)
The Great Jazz Piano of Phineas Newborn Jr. (Contemporary, 1963)With Sal NisticoHeavyweights (Jazzland, 1961)
 Neo/Nistico (Bee Hive, 1978)With Horace ParlanMovin' & Groovin' (1960; Blue Note)With Cecil Payne and Duke JordanBrooklyn Brothers (Muse, 1973)With Oscar Peterson Blues Etude (1966; Limelight)
 Soul Espanol (1966; Limelight)
 The Way I Really Play (1968; MPS)
 Mellow Mood (1968; MPS)
 Travelin' On (1968; MPS)
 Hello Herbie (1969; MPS)
 Tristeza on Piano (1970; MPS)With Bud PowellTime Waits (1958; Blue Note)With Julian PriesterKeep Swingin' (Riverside, 1960)
Spiritsville (Jazzland, 1960)With Ike QuebecThe Complete Blue Note 45 Sessions (Blue Note, 1959–62)
Blue & Sentimental (Blue Note, 1961)With Jimmy RaneyThe Influence (Xanadu, 1975)
Live in Tokyo (Xanadu, 1976)With Sonny RedOut of the Blue (1960; Blue Note)With Dizzy Reece
Comin' On! (Blue Note, 1960)
Blowin' Away (Interplay, 1978)
With Red Rodney
Bird Lives! (Muse, 1973)
The Red Tornado (Muse, 1975)
With Sal Salvador
Starfingers (Bee Hive, 1978)
With Archie Shepp
On Green Dolphin Street (Denon, 1978)
With Louis Smith
Prancin (SteepleChase, 1979)With Les SpannGemini (Jazzland, 1961)With James SpauldingJames Spaulding Plays the Legacy of Duke Ellington (Storyville, 1977)With Sonny StittTune-Up! (Cobblestone, 1972)
Constellation (Cobblestone, 1972)
12! (Muse, 1972)
My Buddy: Sonny Stitt Plays for Gene Ammons (Muse, 1975)
Blues for Duke (Muse, 1975 [1978])With Idrees SuliemanNow Is the Time (SteepleChase, 1976)With Art TaylorTaylor's Tenors (1959; Prestige)With Clark TerryIn Orbit (1958; Riverside)
Top and Bottom Brass (Riverside, 1959)With Lucky ThompsonConcert: Friday the 13th - Cook County Jail (Groove Merchant, 1973)
I Offer You (Groove Merchant, 1973)With Teri ThorntonDevil May Care (Riverside, 1961)With Bobby Timmons This Here is Bobby Timmons (1960; Riverside)
 Soul Time (1960; Riverside)
 Easy Does It (1961; Riverside)
Sweet and Soulful Sounds (1962; Riverside)
 Born to Be Blue! (1963; Riverside)
From the Bottom (1964; Riverside)
Workin' Out! (1964; Riverside)
Little Barefoot Soul (1964; Prestige)With Stanley TurrentineNever Let Me Go (Blue Note, 1963)With Harold VickDon't Look Back (Strata-East, 1974)With Eddie "Cleanhead" VinsonBack Door Blues (Riverside, 1962)With Cedar WaltonBreakthrough! (Muse, 1972)
A Night At Boomers, Vol. 1 (Muse, 1973)
A Night At Boomers, Vol. 2 (Muse, 1973)
Firm Roots (Muse, 1974 [1976])
Pit Inn (East Wind, 1974)
Eastern Rebellion (Timeless, 1976) – with George Coleman & Billy Higgins
The Pentagon (East Wind, 1976)
Eastern Rebellion 2 (Timeless, 1977) – with Bob Berg & Billy Higgins
First Set (SteepleChase, 1977)
Second Set (SteepleChase, 1977)
Third Set (SteepleChase, 1977)
Eastern Rebellion 3 (Timeless, 1980) – with Curtis Fuller, Bob Berg & Billy HigginsWith Roosevelt WardellThe Revelation (Prestige, 1960)With Ben WebsterSoulmates (Riverside, 1963) – with Joe ZawinulWith Don WilkersonThe Texas Twister (Riverside, 1960)With Claude WilliamsonNew Departure (Interplay, 1978)With Joe Zawinul'''Money in the Pocket'' (Atlantic, 1967)

References

1924 births
1981 deaths
American jazz double-bassists
Male double-bassists
American jazz cellists
American jazz composers
American male jazz composers
Musicians from Jacksonville, Florida
Muse Records artists
Xanadu Records artists
SteepleChase Records artists
20th-century American composers
Soul-jazz bass guitarists
Guitarists from Florida
20th-century American bass guitarists
American male bass guitarists
20th-century double-bassists
20th-century American male musicians
Cannonball Adderley Quintet members
20th-century jazz composers
20th-century cellists